Bobby Lee (Robert Paul Lee born 1949, died 2023), was a pedal steel guitar player and active promoter of the instrument, creating several Internet websites and most recognized as the founder of the Steel Guitar Forum.

Inspired by the steel guitar styles of Jerry Garcia (with The Grateful Dead) and Don Helms (with Hank Williams), Bobby Lee took up the steel guitar in 1972.  He started performing with country bands in Northern California in 1975, and became a common fixture in Sonoma County's country music scene starting in 1979.  His country band affiliations included The Cowpokes, The Western Rhythm Gang, The Wheelers, Scott Gerber, The StringBusters and The Country All-Stars, among many others.  In 1996, he recorded and produced Quasar Steel Guitar, a CD of his steel guitar music.

In 2001, Bobby Lee joined John Reese and Open Hearts, a band that plays original music in a wide variety of styles.  He played on two of their CDs, and left the band in 2008.  In 2009, he joined forces with Al Stern (drums), Ehlert Lassen (acoustic guitar) and Dennis Lassen (acoustic bass and piano) to create The Burnside Scramblers, a band fond of playing western swing music and standards.
 
As "b0b" (his online handle), Bobby became involved in BBSes in the 1980s.  He leveraged that experience to start The Steel Guitar Forum in 1997.  Over the years that followed, The Steel Guitar Forum has become the online center of the international steel guitar community.

In addition to his musical and internet activities, Bobby Lee is a professional software engineer specializing in consumer graphics applications.

Bobby Lee passed away on March 7, 2023  surrounded by his family at his home in Cloverdale, California.

External links
 The Pedal Steel Pages.
 The Steel Guitar Forum.
The Steel Guitar Forum Store (Steel Guitar Shopper).
The Beatles Workshop
 Open Hearts Music.
 The Technical Academy Plays -b0b- an album of computer-generated music programmed by Bobby Lee in 1991.
 b0badel a variant of Citadel BBS software created by Bobby Lee in the early 1990s.
 BBS Documentary Interview
 The Burnside Scramblers.

Pedal steel guitarists
Living people
Year of birth missing (living people)